Zhou Ziqi (17 November 1869 – 21 October 1923) was a Chinese educator and politician in the late Qing dynasty and early republican period. During the early part of the Republic, he served multiple roles: first in multiple ministry positions (including Communication and Finance), as a diplomat, then as acting President of the Republic, and, for a time, as acting Premier in 1922, during Liang Shiyi's illness. He was a member of the Communications Clique.

Biography
Born in Guangdong, Zhou, who spoke both Cantonese and Mandarin, later moved back to his ancestral province of Shandong. He attended Columbia University in the United States, and upon returning to China, he helped found Tsinghua University to prepare Chinese students to study abroad in America; among the subjects he emphasized were English, mathematics, and science. During his time at Tsinghua, Zhou was in charge of sending students to study abroad, and from 1911 to 1912, he served as president of the university.

As the governor of Shandong Province, he exerted significant influence, helping leak information about the Twenty-One Demands to the media.

A supporter of Yuan Shikai, the provisional president, and his actions to revert China from a republic to a monarch-led empire, Zhou, during his tenure as governor of Shandong, believed that the Chinese people, with a literacy rate of 2%, were not ready to govern themselves. In his view, the people could only be manipulated by politicians, and their actions would bring instability and chaos to the country. (To further buttress his argument, Zhou may have invited Columbia University political scientist Frank Johnson Goodnow to justify monarchism for China.) In 1913, Yuan appointed him Minister of War, a post in which he served until the following year.

Yuan attempted to re-establish the Empire of China in late 1915, sending Zhou to the Empire of Japan as a special envoy. The Japanese government under Okuma Shigenobu rejected him, and he returned to China to tell Yuan that his government had lost foreign support. After the failure of the restoration of the monarchy and Yuan's death in June 1916, Zhou found that his support for the Empire was not without personal cost: considered one of the eight top monarchists of the former regime, he was declared a traitor; and the new President, Li Yuanhong, ordered his arrest, causing Zhou to flee to Japan for asylum. After being pardoned by President Feng Guozhang in 1918, he served as Minister of Finance in 1920, under Xu Shichang.

As finance minister, he lost a power struggle against Premier Jin Yunpeng in 1921, and was compelled to resign. Seeking revenge, he convinced Zhang Zuolin to replace the premier with Liang Shiyi, the head of the civilian Communications Clique. That same year, he served as a member of the Chinese delegation to the Washington Naval Conference, before his resignation due to the "negative results" of the conference.

Zhou also served as President of the Bank of China, Minister of Communication, Minister of Military, Minister of Agriculture and Commerce, and the Inspector General of Salt.

In 1922, he briefly served as acting premier and acting president, after the resignation of Liang as premier (due to illness), and, later, Xu as President. His presidency, the shortest in Chinese history, was an interim one, as the Zhili clique tried to woo Li Yuanhong back into office.  Having succeeded, but complaining of Zhili interference, he left to study film-making in the United States, later returning to China to start a film studio. He died on Oct 21, 1923 at his home in Beijing.

References

|-

|-

Presidents of the Republic of China
1869 births
1923 deaths
Premiers of the Republic of China
Columbia University alumni
Recipients of Chinese presidential pardons
Politicians from Chaozhou
Republic of China politicians from Guangdong
Progressive Party (China) politicians
20th-century Chinese heads of government
Governors of Shandong
Chinese filmmakers